National road 2 (abbreviated as DK2) is part of the Polish national road network. The highway connects the western and eastern regions of Poland, running from Świecko at the German border to Terespol at the border with Belarus, traversing through the Lubusz, Greater Poland, Łódź Masovian and Lublin voivodeships. National road 2 is part of European highway E30.

It is currently undergoing extensive change, with construction of the A2 motorway expanding various parts of the older road to motorway standards and eliminating parts of the previous route. Between Świecko and Warsaw and near Mińsk Mazowiecki, the old route has been superseded by the A2 motorway and S2 express way. The part of the old route that no longer belongs to National road 2 is renumbered to National road 92, and is frequently referred to as the "old 2".

Major cities and towns along the route 
 Świecko (road 29)
 Rzepin (road 92)
 Poznań (road 5, 11)
 Września (road 15, 92)
 Konin (road 25, 72)
 Łowicz (road 14, 70, 92)
 Sochaczew (road 50)
 Warsaw (road 7, 8, 61, 79, 17)
 Mińsk Mazowiecki (road 50)
 Siedlce (road 63)
 Międzyrzec Podlaski (road 19)
 Biała Podlaska
 Terespol (border with Belarus)

02
Constituent roads of European route E30